The Silverstone Classic is an annual three-day car and race event at the Silverstone Circuit, home of the British Grand Prix. The event features hundreds of historic race cars in circa 20 races over the weekend, displays from over 100 car clubs with more than 10,000 classic cars, free access to the paddocks and grandstands, interactive activities, dynamic demonstrations, live music on Friday and Saturday evenings, a shopping village and lots more.

Founded in 1990, the Silverstone Classic was one of the first of motor sport meetings dedicated entirely to historic racing cars, in 2019 it had a record attendance of 109,000. The Classic will celebrate its 30th anniversary in 2020 (31 July – 2 August). Originally held in late July, the 2022 edition was moved to the late August bank holiday.

Races
2019’s Classic programme consisted of 21 retro races and some of the winners were presented with their trophies by racing legends including Jackie Stewart, Gordon Spice, and Paddy Hopkirk.

Both Silverstone’s paddock complexes are used during the weekend of the Classic to accommodate the large number of entrants, with racing taking place out of the National Paddock in the morning and the International Paddock in the afternoon.

Anniversaries

2022 (26 to 28 August)
 60th anniversary of the Ford Cortina
 60th anniversary of the Morris 1100
 60th anniversary of James Bond films
 60th anniversary of the Shelby Cobra / AC Cobra
 60th anniversary of the Lotus Elan
 50th anniversary of BMW M
 40th anniversary of the Group C

2021 (30 July to 1 August)

 110th anniversary of Alfa Romeo
 100th anniversary of the Lancia Lambda
 70th anniversary of the Volkswagen Type 2
 60th anniversary of the Jaguar E-Type
 50th anniversary of the Triumph Stag
 50th anniversary of the Range Rover
 50th anniversary of the Datsun 240Z
 40th anniversary of the DMC DeLorean
 25th anniversary of the Lotus Elise
 25th anniversary of the Porsche Boxster

2019 (26 to 28 July)

 50th anniversary of Jackie Stewart's first win at Silverstone in 1969
 100th anniversary of Bentley
 70th anniversary of Abarth
 60th anniversary of the Mini
 50th anniversary of the Capri

2018 (20 to 22 July)

 70th anniversary of the first British Grand Prix at Silverstone
 60th anniversary of Formula Junior
 60th anniversary of the British Touring Car Championship

2017 (28 to 30 July)

 Record-breaking display of McLarens to mark what would have been company founder, Bruce McLaren’s 80th birthday
 40th anniversary of Williams and the 25th anniversary of Nigel Mansell’s Championship win with Williams
 25th anniversary of the Jaguar XJ220

2016 (29 to 31 July)

50 Years of Can-Am racing - special double-header race named the 'Can-Am 50 Insterie Celebration Trophy' was the main feature.
40th anniversary of James Hunt's 1976 World Championship
50th anniversary of the Lamborghini Miura
35th anniversary of the Vauxhall Cavalier Mk2

2015 (24 to 26 July)
25th anniversary of the Silverstone Classic
50 Years of Alpina

2014 (25 to 27 July)
Ford Mustang official 50th anniversary gathering with special displays and track parade
Maserati centenary celebration
World record parade of 84 grands prix cars led by Sir Stirling Moss to mark the 50th F1 grand prix at Silverstone

2013 (26 to 28 July)
Special parade of 911 x Porsche 911 to celebrate the 50th birthday of the world's most successful sportscar
Aston Martin centenary, celebrated with an extensive car display and a 100 car parade lap.
Displays and parades to mark 50 years of Lamborghini

2012 (20 to 22 July)
World record gathering of 60 Ferrari F40 to celebrate the supercar's 25th birthday
MG MGB 50th anniversary
Special 50th birthday parties for Lotus Elan and AC Cobra models
Special races to mark 30 years of Group C sports prototypes and 25 years of the Ford Sierra RS500
The UK's first Z-Fest to mark the 60th anniversary of the BMW Car Club

2011
Jaguar E-Type 50th anniversary gathering, achieving the Guinness World Record for the Largest Parade of Jaguar cars with 767 cars on the track
21st Silverstone Classic event

2010
Celebration of the 50th anniversary of Formula One

2009
Mini 50th anniversary with four special races including the Laurence Bloom Memorial Trophy

Other attractions

As well as the on-track racing, the Silverstone Classic festival includes live music sets from classic rock and pop bands from the 1960s, 1970s, 1980s and 1990s. Well known bands to have appeared in recent years include: UB40, Soul II Soul, The Stranglers, Reef, The Boomtown Rats, and the legendary Status Quo in 2015 for the Classic’s 25th anniversary. The line-up for the 30th anniversary celebrations in 2020 is yet to be announced

In addition to numerous trade stands, club displays, live demonstrations, and family activities on the Village Green, car auctions are held at each Silverstone Classic. Since 2011, the auctions have been run by Nick Whale's Silverstone Auctions with over £6m of sales in recent years.

References

External links

Silverstone Circuit event page

Historic motorsport events
Motorsport in the United Kingdom
Sport in Buckinghamshire
Sport in Northamptonshire